Ampelakiakos Football Club is a Greek football club, based in Ampelakia, Attica (region), Greece.

Honours

Domestic Titles and honours

 Piraeus FCA champion: 1
 2017-18

References

Football clubs in Attica
Association football clubs established in 1937
1937 establishments in Greece
Gamma Ethniki clubs